A Chinese typewriter is a typewriter that can type Chinese script. Early European typewriters began appearing in the early 19th century. However, as the Chinese language uses a logographic writing system, fitting thousands of Chinese characters on the machine needed much more complex engineering than typewriters using a simple Latin alphabet, or other non-logographic scripts. An ordinary Chinese printing office uses 6,000 Chinese characters. Chinese typewriters, and similar Japanese typewriters invented by Kyota Sugimoto, which use kanji adopted from the Chinese writing system, started to appear only in the early 20th century. There have been at least five dozen versions of Chinese typewriters, ranging from sizable mechanical models to sophisticated electric word processors.

Hou-Kun Chow Tong-Zhi typewriter 

Hou-Kun Chow, a mechanical engineer in Shanghai, is credited with inventing the first Chinese typewriter in 1916. His typewriter typed 4,000 characters. He had studied in the United States like several other Chinese who also contributed to the development of Chinese typewriters. Chow first thought about the practicality of a Chinese typewriter in Boston, while he was inspecting American typewriters as a student of the Massachusetts Institute of Technology. His efforts were initially hindered by a lack of technical assistance in Shanghai.

Chow considered it impossible to build a Chinese typewriter with a separate key for each Chinese character. Instead, his design used a revolving cylinder containing the characters. They were ordered by radicals and number of strokes on the cylinder, like a Chinese dictionary.

Chow expected his typewriter to be used in Chinese offices where multiple copies of documents would have to be made, and by Chinese living in foreign countries without access to skilled writers of Chinese.

IBM's Electric Chinese Typewriter 
On June 28, 1944, Kao Chung-Chin, an inventor at IBM, filed for a patent with the United States Patent and Trademark Office, and on December 17, 1946 was issued patent number 2412777A for his invention. Chung-Chin's typewriter employed 36 keys, divided across four banks. The first bank had six keys numbered 0 through 5, and the three other banks each had 10 keys numbered 0 through 9. In order to type a character, the operator was required to simultaneously select one key from each of the four banks. Each of those four-digit combinations corresponded to one of 5,400 Chinese characters, or other symbols such as punctuation marks, which were etched onto the surface of a revolving drum inside the typewriter. The drum had a diameter of 7 inches, a length of 11 inches, and made a complete revolution once per second, allowing for the operator to achieve a maximum typing speed of 45 words per minute.

Wanneng and Double Pigeon typewriters
Chinese typewriters made in Japan entered the market in the 1920s, with the Wanneng brand, introduced by the Nippon Typewriter Company in 1940 during the Second Sino-Japanese War, becoming the de facto standard.  After Japan's defeat and the subsequent nationalization of typewriter companies by the Communist government, locally made models based on the Wanneng continued to dominate the market, particularly the Double Pigeon.

Ming Kwai typewriter 

The Ming Kwai typewriter is an electromechanical typewriter invented and patented by Lin Yutang. The patent, No. 2613795, was filed on April 17, 1946 by Lin, and was issued by the United States Patent and Trademark Office on October 14, 1952. One of Lin's intentions was to help modernize China. Lin called his design the "Ming Kwai" typewriter and promoted it as "The Only Chinese Typewriter Designed for Everybody's Use". The two Chinese characters "Ming kwai" means "clear" (as in understandable) and "quick".

Lin had a prototype machine custom built by the Carl E. Krum Company, a small engineering-design consulting firm with an office in New York City. That multilingual typewriter was the size of a conventional office typewriter of the 1940s. It measured . The typefaces fit on a drum. A "magic eye" was mounted in the center of the keyboard which magnifies and allows the typist to review a selected character. Characters are selected by first pressing two keys to choose a desired character which is arranged according to a system Lin devised for his dictionary of the Chinese language. The selected Chinese character appeared in the magic eye for preview, the typist then pressed a "master" key, similar to today's computer function key. The typewriter could create 90,000 distinct characters using either one or two of six character-containing rollers, which in combination has 7000 full characters and 1,400 character radicals or partial characters.

The inspired aspect of the typewriter was the system Lin devised for a Chinese script. It had thirty geometric shapes or strokes (somewhat analogous to the elements of a glyph). These became "letters" by which to alphabetize Chinese characters. He broke tradition with the long-standing system of radicals and stroke order writing and categorizing of Chinese characters, inventing a new way of seeing and categorizing.

The typewriter was not produced commercially. According to Lin's daughter, Lin Tai-Yi, the day she was to demonstrate the machine to executives of the Remington Typewriter Company, they could not make it work. Although they did get the machine fixed for a press conference the next day, it was to no avail. Lin found himself deeply in debt. In 1947, Lin paid income taxes owed to the Internal Revenue Service and went to work in Paris for UNESCO.

Cultural and technological impact 

Between the 1930s and 1950s, Chinese typewriters had a political implication, as they were used in mass-production of leaflets and pamphlets. The typewriters also gained popular appeal and changed Chinese office work.

According to Thomas Mullaney, it is possible that development of modern Chinese typewriters in the 1960s and 1970s influenced the development of modern computer word processors and even affected the development of computers themselves. In the 1950s, typists came to rearrange the character layout from the standard dictionary layout to groups of common words and phrases.  Chinese typewriter engineers were trying to make the most common characters be accessible at the fastest speed possible by word prediction, a technique used today in Chinese input methods for computers, as well as in text messaging in many languages. This arrangement was called the lianxiang (“connected thought”) layout, similar to predictive text and sped typing speeds from about 20 words per minute to around 80. 

Chinese typewriter has become a metaphor for absurdity, complexity and backwardness in Western popular culture. One such example is MC Hammer's dance move named after the Chinese typewriter in the music video for "U Can't Touch This". The move, with its fast paced and large gestures, supposedly resembles a person working on a huge, complex typewriter.

The Chinese typewriter was ultimately eclipsed and made redundant with the introduction of computerised word processing, pioneered by engineer and dissident Wan Runnan and his partners when they formed Stone Emerging Industries Company in 1984 in Zhongguancun, China's "Silicon Valley".  The last Chinese typewriters were completed around 1991. Stone developed software based on Alps Electric custom made 8088 based hardware with a Brother Industries dot matrix printer, distributed by Mitsui, to print Chinese characters and released the system as the MS-2400.

Notes

References 

 Bliven, Bruce Jr. The Wonderful Writing Machine. New York: Random House, 1954.
 Chinese Typewriter: A Real Character Study", Business Week (August 30, 1947), p. 16.
 Lin, Tai-Yi. "My Father, Lin Yutang", Reader's Digest (December 1990) p:161-191.
 Lin, Yutang, Lin Yutang's Chinese-English Dictionary of Modern Usage. Hong Kong: The Chinese University of Hong Kong, 1972.
 Tsu, Jing. "Lin Yutang's Typewriter."  In Sound and Script in Chinese Diaspora.  Cambridge: Harvard University Press, 2010, pp. 49–79.

Further reading
Thomas S. Mullaney (2017), The Chinese Typewriter: A History (MIT Press),

Articles
 1 Billion People. 100,000 Characters. 1 Typewriter. The machine that changed a language forever. By Thomas S. Mullaney, July 16, 2018, Foreign Policy.  alternate link, at website Get Pocket.

External links 

 Chinese Typewriter, Language Log
Chinese Typewriter, part2, Language Log
 Chinese Typewriter, Thomas Mullaney
 How it Works: The Chinese Typewriter, Wired (magazine)
 History of a "Scribal Machine", The Harvard Gazette (April 2, 2009)

Chinese orthography
Han character input
Text
Typewriters